Yakshur-Bodyinsky District (Jakšur-Böďja joros) is an administrative and municipal district (raion), one of the twenty-five in the Udmurt Republic, Russia. It is located in the center of the republic. Its administrative center is the rural locality (a selo) of Yakshur-Bodya. Population:  22,599 (2002 Census);  The population of Yakshur-Bodya accounts for 33.8% of the district's total population.

See also
Chur, Udmurt Republic

References

Notes

Sources

Districts of Udmurtia